Isopropyl chloride  is an organic compound with the chemical formula (CH3)2CHCl.  It is a colourless to slightly yellow, volatile, flammable liquid with a sweet, ether-like (almost like petroleum) odour. It is used industrially as a solvent.  It is produced industrially by the addition of HCl to propylene: 
CH3CH=CH2  +  HCl  →  (CH3)2CHCl

Isopropyl chloride can be easily produced in the lab by reacting concentrated hydrochloric acid with isopropyl alcohol in the presence of a calcium chloride or zinc chloride catalyst. The common ratio of alcohol to acid to catalyst is 1:2:1 using 30% HCl and near pure isopropanol.  The reaction mixture is refluxed for several hours, or distilled over several hours. The isopropyl chloride is then separated from the remaining isopropyl alcohol by washing with water (the isopropyl chloride will form in insoluble layer above the water, while the alcohol will dissolve into solution along with any HCl present).

In the presence of a catalyst, dry isopropyl chloride reacts with magnesium to give isopropylmagnesium chloride.

When burned, isopropyl chloride releases copious amounts of hydrogen chloride gas, water vapor, carbon oxides, and some soot. It burns inefficiently with a smoky, yellowish flame.

Further reading

References

Chloroalkanes
Isopropyl compounds